Donald Walter Gordon Murray,  (May 29, 1894 – January 7, 1976), also known as "Gordon Murray", was a Canadian cardiac surgeon.

Born in Ontario, he enrolled at the University of Toronto to study medicine in 1914. During World War I, he enlisted as an artilleryman and rose to the rank of sergeant. After the war, he graduated in 1921. In 1927, he started work at the Toronto General Hospital. He is known for performing the first homograft implant into the descending thoracic aorta to treat aortic regurgitation.

In 1967, he was made a Companion of the Order of Canada "for his contribution to the development of new surgical procedures and achievements in the field of medical research".

References
 Surgical limits: the life of Gordon Murray by Shelley McKellar

1894 births
1976 deaths
Canadian cardiac surgeons
University of Toronto alumni
Companions of the Order of Canada
20th-century surgeons